Allium obtusum is a species of wild onion known by the common name red Sierra onion or subalpine onion. It is native to eastern California and western Nevada. In Nevada, it is reported only from Washoe County in the northwestern part of the state.

Description
The red Sierra onion, Allium obtusum, grows from a bulb one or two centimeters wide and bears a scape which can range from 2 to 17 cm tall. Unlike Allium campanulatum, A. obtusum has leaves that do not wither before the flowers bloom. Atop the scape is an umbel of up to 60 flowers,  each of which may be 4 to 12 millimeters wide. The tepals are white, purple, or pink with dark purple midveins. Anthers are yellow or purple; pollen purple.

Varieties
Two varieties are recognized:

Allium obtusum var. obtusum—Leaves 0.5-4.0 mm wide; tepals white with dark midveins—most of the range of the species
Allium obtusum var. conspicuum Mortola & McNeal—Leaves 2–14 mm wide; tepals pink with darker midvein—from about Lake Tahoe area to Mt Lassen area

See also
List of plants of the Sierra Nevada (U.S.)
California interior chaparral and woodlands
Sierra Nevada subalpine zone

References

External links

 Calflora Database: Allium obtusum (red Sierra onion)
 Jepson eFlora treatment of Allium obtusum
 USDA Plants Profile for Allium obtusum (red Sierra onion)
 Allium obtusum — UC. Photos gallery

obtusum
Flora of California
Flora of Nevada
Flora of the Sierra Nevada (United States)
Flora of the Cascade Range
Onions
Plants described in 1890
Plants described in 1985